The lesser yellow underwing (Noctua comes) is a moth of the family Noctuidae.

Distribution
It is found in the Palearctic realm (Europe, North Africa, Canary Islands, Middle East, South Russia, Caucasus, Transcaucasia, Turkey, Iraq, Iran, Afghanistan, north-west India, Novosibirsk, Central Asia, and in Denver (Colorado) ). It was introduced into British Columbia in about 1982 and has spread southward in the Pacific Northwest. It has recently been reported from Ontario (Crolla 2008). Full synonymy given in Lafontaine. It is a common species but not as abundant as its larger relative large yellow underwing (Noctua pronuba).

Description

This species generally has the appearance of a smaller (wingspan 38–48 mm) version of the large yellow underwing Noctua pronuba. The forewings are equally variable in pattern and colour, from pale clay to reddish clay, light brown to almost black. The stigmata are dark and outlined with pale yellow. The crosslines are weak. The wavy line flows on to the front edge as a no more than dark brown (never black) stain, which is sometimes extended down the entire wavy line. The hindwings are orange-yellow with a broad black sub-terminal band and central discal lunule (usually absent in Noctua pronuba). It is also similar to the lunar yellow underwing Noctua orbona. In the overall impression a broad-winged species.

It flies at night from July to September  and is attracted to light and flowers such as heather, marram grass, and ragwort.

The larva is also very similar to that of Noctua pronuba – green or brown with black dashes along the back. Its feeding habits, however, are very different: this is not a "cutworm" but feeds on the foliage of a range of plants, trees, and shrubs as well as herbaceous plants (see list below). This species overwinters as a larva.

Notes
The flight season refers to the British Isles. This may vary in other parts of the range.

Recorded food plants
Betula – birch
Calluna – heather
Cirsium – thistle
Crataegus – hawthorn
Digitalis – foxglove
Fragaria – strawberry
Plantago – plantain
Prunus – blackthorn
Rumex – docks and sorrel
Salix – willow
See Robinson, G. S. et al.

Gallery

References

 Chinery, Michael (1991). Collins Guide to the Insects of Britain and Western Europe.
 Skinner, Bernard (1984). Colour Identification Guide to Moths of the British Isles.

External links
Lepiforum
Noctua comes, at funet.fi
Fauna Europaea

Noctua (moth)
Moths described in 1813
Moths of Africa
Moths of Asia
Moths of Europe
Moths of Iceland
Moths of the Middle East
Moths of North America
Taxa named by Jacob Hübner
Palearctic Lepidoptera